Richard Murray may refer to:
 Richard Murray (businessman), businessman and former chairman of Charlton Athletic F.C.
 Richard Murray (mathematician) (c. 1726–1799), provost of Trinity College, Dublin
 Richard William Murray (1819–1908), journalist and politician in the Cape Colony
 Richard Murray (Australian politician) (1840–1887), Irish-born Australian politician
 Richard Paget Murray (1842–1908), clergyman, botanist and lepidopterist
 Richard R. Murray (born 1956), founder of Equity Schools Inc.
 Richard Murray (triathlete) (born 1989), South African triathlete
 Richard Murray (cricketer) (1831–1861), Australian cricketer
 Richard Murray (priest) (1779–1854), Anglican priest
 Rich Murray (born 1957), first baseman in Major League Baseball
 Rich Murray (politician) (born 1957), Minnesota politician
 Richard M. Murray, synthetic biologist